The veiled chameleon (Chamaeleo calyptratus) is a species of chameleon (family Chamaeleonidae) native to the Arabian Peninsula in Yemen and Saudi Arabia. Other common names include cone-head chameleon, Yemen chameleon, and Yemeni chameleon They are born pastel green and without their distinctive casques on their head. They grow this as well as become more colorful as they mature. They are known for their variable color changes due to a variety of factors, including to show aggression, social status, reproduction, and stress. Females live around 5 years and males live for around 8 and they breed a few times a year.

Description

Newly hatched offspring are born pastel green in color and develop stripes and different colors as they mature. Adult females are green with white, orange, yellow, or tan mottling. Adult males are brighter with more defined bands of yellow or blue and some mottling.

Coloration can be affected by several factors, including social status. In experimental conditions, young veiled chameleons reared in isolation developed to be darker and duller in color compared to those raised with other individuals. Females change color over the course of their reproductive cycles. Chameleons also tend to change to a much darker color when stressed.

Subspecies
Chamaeleo calyptratus calyptratus A.M.C. Duméril & A.H.A. Duméril, 1851 – veiled chameleon
Chamaeleo calyptratus calcarifer W. Peters, 1871 – short-casqued chameleon

Habitat and Distribution
The veiled chameleon (Chamaeleo calyptratus) is an arboreal species. It is native to the south-western Arabian Peninsula where the climate is semi-arid and tropical. It is highly susceptible to stress which makes it a species difficult to treat in captivity.

This chameleon lives in a number of habitat types in its native range, including plateaus, mountains, and valleys. Like most other chameleons, it is arboreal, living in trees and other large plants.

Diet
The veiled chameleon is primarily insectivorous. Like other chameleons, the veiled chameleon has the ability to capture large prey but their diets mainly consist of small prey However, it is one of several chameleon species also known to consume plant matter. This is believed to perhaps be used as a source of water during the dry season.

Behavior

Reproduction and Life Cycle 
Veiled chameleons reach sexual maturity at four to five months and breed multiple times in a year. The female lays large clutches of up to 85 white, tough eggs and buries them in sand. The embryos experience a diapause, a length of time when they are dormant in the egg before they begin developing, increasing temperatures in the substrate initiate development.

A 2004 study found that the embryonic development of chameleons (specifically the veiled chameleon) usually initiates at fertilization and continues until hatching, but sometimes development stunts at the gastrula stage for months after the eggs have been laid. The researchers involved discovered that moisture levels have little to do with this delay, but that temperature plays a determinant role in development time; an increase in ambient temperature initiates development of diapausing embryos.

Juvenile chameleons can grow up to two orders of magnitude in body mass within a year of hatching. The feeding mechanisms (mouth, snout, tongue, jaw) all grow rapidly while still needing to be functional. Thus, the musculoskeletal system of the feeding mechanisms grow with negative allometry relative to snout-vent length (SVL). Studies on captured veiled chameleons showed that velocity of jaw movement tends to be greater in adults than juveniles. Thus in the development phase between adult and juvenile, there is a change in energy storage and tongue projection release mechanisms.

It was found that unlike many other reptiles, the sex ratios of the veiled chameleon are not affected by incubation temperature. Even with differential mortality as a factor,  the sex ratio bias is negligible. Anecdotal suggestions of temperature-dependent sex ratios in the veiled chameleon were accrued from reporting and statistical errors.

Veiled chameleons have a naturally short lifespan, so even with good care, they may only live 6-8 years. Males typically live longer than females.

Protective Coloration 
For color changing species such as the veiled chameleon, signaling is important between animals to prevent needless energy expended on attacking competition. Stable and nonaggressive states come with a static coloration and will have a dynamic change when that state is altered. Veiled chameleons will typically brighten their coloring before approaching a rival as a signal of aggression. They will also maximize their stripe brightness for as long as possible to signal the strength of their bite. The longer and brighter the stripe lasts correlates to a stronger bite. This may aid in deterring disproportionately weaker or stronger chameleons from challenging. In this way, both contestants will save time, risk, and energy by not challenging an asymmetrical rival. It is likely that such color changing behavior serves as an evolutionary stable strategy to mutually benefit individuals by preventing unnecessary escalation. Brighter and more yellow stripes are also a signal of increased aggression.

While brighter strip coloring typically correlates to more willingness to approach an opponent, brighter head coloring signifies a higher tendency to win fights. Rapidity of color change is also telling of the success of a confrontational outcome. Veiled chameleons are one of the first species to undergo color changing studies focused on speed rather than just intensity of the color. Male veiled chameleons tend to engage in vehement intra-sexual aggressive behavior. Before engaging, males will typically engage the color change laterally from a distance to maximize the opportunity to assess the coloration. When males engage with one another, they tend to begin the confrontation head to head which offers a clear view of the vivid head color change.

All chameleons can engage in color change through a lattice of guanine nanocrystals embedded in a superficially thick layer of dermal iridophores. Veiled chameleons specifically exhibit two superposed layers of iridophores. The two layer structure may allow veiled chameleons to camouflage as well as relay behavioral signaling and may also provide thermal protection.

Mating 
Males display for females during courtship, performing behaviors such as "head rolls" and "chin rubs". Females change color when they are receptive to breeding, and males are more likely to court them during this time.

Females are receptive to mating when pale-blue (robin’s egg shade) spots appear on their dorsums. They undergo constant clutch cycles that correlate with their hormonal reproductive status.

Male courtship involves exhibiting bright colors, lateral body flattening, body swaying, and tail curling. Males will approach the females and nudge them with their chin while vibrating from an internal origin during contact. The female will then mount the male and the male uses tarsal spurs to caress the female’s flank. Copulation can last anywhere between a few minutes to an hour and can occur several times per day. When copulation is successful, females will darken their green coloration and the intensity of their yellow patterns will increase. If a female is not receptive to the male, her body will turn dark brown to black with white or yellow mottled markings. She may also become aggressive or violent and bite the male if he continues to advance unwanted.

Parental Care 
After mating in captivity, a female chameleon will decrease feeding three to four weeks and will spend more time at the bottom of the cage searching for an appropriate egg-laying site. Tunnels will typically reach to the bottom of the container and will be covered with substrate debris after oviposition is completed (which tends to make them difficult to find). Females may dig another tunnel and lay more eggs after about a week. Females should be given easy access between higher sites in the cage and their tunnels via a branch or something similar.

In captivity, eggs should be retrieved then placed into tupperware with a 1:1 ratio mix of vermiculite and water to a depth of about 1-1.5 inches with the eggs buried lengthwise and half covered. Eggs may absorb moisture and expand so they should be placed 0.5 to 1 inches apart from each other. Embryos have been shown to start development sooner when subjected to higher temperatures while degree of moisture showed no significant impact.  Eggs should be incubated at 26 to 30 degrees Celsius at a humidity of 95%. Neonates should be allowed at least one day to roam their container before moving. Neonate nurseries should consist of a ten gallon screen top aquarium with a base one third to one half filled with decorative artificial plants. Two to six hatchlings should be raised together for the first few months then moved to adult enclosures with increased amounts of vegetation once they reach four to six inches. They can be placed individually from each other once they reach four to six months old.

Disease
The veiled chameleon, like many reptiles, is susceptible to ocular infections. Similar subcutaneous swellings can be associated with bacterial or fungal abscesses, parasitic infestation, and (rarely) neoplasia.

Juvenile veiled chameleons in captivity often develop nutritional metabolic bone disease but will not develop it if fed dietary supplements of Ca, vitamin A, vitamin D, and cholecalciferol as well as exposure to UVB radiation.

Veiled chameleons in captivity tend to develop maladies such as hypovitaminosis A, hypervitaminosis A, renal failure, dystocia (a failure to lay eggs), respiratory problems (usually due to improper humidity), parasitic infections, and oral cavity problems. Corneal damage can also be caused from an overabundance of UVB radiation.

Captivity
The veiled chameleon is the most common chameleon species in the pet trade; this species has been kept and bred in captivity for almost thirty years. Veiled chameleons are more tolerant of captive conditions than other chameleon species, but are still challenging pets to keep healthy.

Research
Because chameleons possess anatomy that is functionalized for an arboreal habitat (such as split hands and feet for grasping, a prehensile tail, a projectile tongue, independently moving turreted eyes, and laterally compressed bodies), the veiled chameleon is becoming an up-and-coming model for the study of functional morphology and evolutionary developmental biology (ev-devo). A 2019 study assembled an annotated, multi-tissue transcriptome for the veiled chameleon to use as a resource in evolutionary and developmental research.

The veiled chameleon is currently used as an experimental model to study the evolutionary transition from reptilian amniotes to mammalian and avian species.

Squamate reptiles comprise about a third of all living amniotes (animals who lay terrestrial eggs). Most of these species are in late development stages at the time of oviposition. However, veiled chameleons are the exception. They breed readily, do not require a cooling period to induce a reproductive cycle, and females produce about 45-90 eggs multiple times a year. Thus, few animals are required to form a productive breeding colony. This makes them an excellent model organism to study developmental and evolutionary phenomena.

Young chameleons have a heterodont dentition with multi-cuspid teeth in the caudal jaw area and simple mono-cuspid teeth rostrally. Chameleon teeth are also acrodont ankylosed to the bones of the jaw. Odontoblasts produce a layer of predentin that connects the dentine to the supporting bone with both tooth and bone protruding out of the oral cavity and acting as a functional unit. This makes chameleons useful in providing information to study the molecular interaction at the tooth-bone interface in physiological and pathological conditions.

Invasive species
This chameleon is an introduced species in Hawaii, where it is invasive in the local ecosystem. There is a breeding population established on Maui. It can also be found in the wild in Florida, where escaped pets have established populations.

Culture
The veiled chameleon is the logo of the SUSE Linux operating system.

The earliest known description of a chameleon was written by Aristotle.

Gallery

References

Further reading

External links

 Veiled Chameleon Care Sheet. The Lizard Lounge.
 Veiled Chameleon. Biotropics.com

Chamaeleo
Lizards of Asia
Chameleon, Veiled
Reptiles described in 1851
Taxa named by André Marie Constant Duméril
Taxa named by Gabriel Bibron